The 2011 South Alabama Jaguars football team represented the University of South Alabama in the 2011 NCAA Division I FCS football season. This was the third season in program's history. They were led by head coach Joey Jones and played their home games at Ladd–Peebles Stadium. This was their third and final season as an FCS independent before joining the Sun Belt Conference of the Football Bowl Subdivision in 2012; it would also be their first season in which all of their opponents were other Division I teams (they had played mostly lower division teams in 2010 and prep schools and junior colleges during their inaugural season in 2009). They finished the season 6–4.

Schedule 

Schedule source

Game summaries

West Alabama

The Jaguars opened the 2011 season at home against the West Alabama Tigers of the Gulf South Conference. The meeting was the first all-time against the Tigers. This was South Alabama's first televised game on local station WJTC and ESPN3.

South Alabama defeated West Alabama 21-10 on Thursday night in the season opener for both teams, improving to 18-0 since starting its football program in 2009. Before the game, starting running backs Kendall Houston and Demetre Baker, as well as wide receiver Corey Besteda  and freshman linebacker Desmond LaVelle, were suspended for the first 2 quarters of the game for violating team rules.

Kendall Houston scored two touchdowns on runs of 2 and 10 yards in the second half for the Jaguars, who broke a 7-7 halftime tie. The Jaguars rushed for 205 yards but quarterback C.J. Bennett threw three interceptions. Gary Johnston led the Tigers with 72 yards and a touchdown, but was intercepted twice and sacked twice. Trailing 13-7, West Alabama cut the lead to 13-10 on a 22-yard field goal by Ryne Smith with 10:58 remaining. Houston’s second touchdown with 8:13 left put the game out of reach.

Lamar

C.J. Bennett threw two touchdown passes as South Alabama defeated Lamar 30-8. Lamar was held to three first downs and 64 yards on offense in the first half as South Alabama scored three times in the second quarter for a 20-0 halftime lead. Bennett passed 10 yards to Corey Waldon in the second quarter and 10 yards to Jereme Jones in the third as the Jaguars built a 27-2 lead. Bennett completed 9 of 14 passes for 144 yards. The Jaguars have beaten Lamar by a combined score of 56-8 in their past two meetings.

NC State

South suffered its first loss in program history when the Jaguars fell 35-13 to NC State in Raleigh, North Carolina. South Alabama kept things competitive into the third quarter of its 35-13 loss to North Carolina State  before allowing the Wolfpack’s Mike Glennon to throw a career-high four touchdown passes. Demetre Baker had an 8-yard scoring run and Jordan Means kicked two field goals, including a school-record 46-yarder, for the Jaguars. C.J. Bennett finished 17 of 32 for 182 yards with two interceptions and Kendall Houston rushed for 117 yards.

Kent State

South Alabama suffered its second loss in the season and second loss in program history, falling short of Kent State 33-25. The Golden Flashes led the Jaguars 26-0 going into halftime. In the second half, after a quick score by Kent State to go up 33-0, South Alabama's offense clicked on and scored 25 unanswered points. The Jaguars had the ball with less than a minute left in the game but came up short. The game finished with a score of 33-25. C.J. Bennett ended the game with 281 yards in the air with 1 TD pass and 3 interceptions. Bryant Lavender was Bennett's favorite target, catching 5 passes for a total of 97 yards. Demetre Baker had 10 rushes for 28 yards and 2 TDs. Kendall Houston ended the game with a miserly 23 yards on 11 rushes.

UTSA

Demetre Baker ran for 87 yards and two touchdowns, including the game winner in double overtime, to lift South Alabama to a 30-27 victory over Texas-San Antonio in South's first overtime game. Kendall Houston finished with 72 yards rushing and a touchdown for the Jaguars. C.J. Bennett finished 11 of 17 passing, throwing for one touchdown score.

UT-Martin

Georgia State

Henderson State

Mississippi Valley State

Cal Poly

Roster

Season notes
 January 19, 2011 - South Alabama received four transfers from several Football Bowl Subdivision teams. On this day, South saw B.J. Scott (Alabama), Demetre Baker (Georgia), and Damond Smith (Western Michigan) enroll for classes.
 January 31, 2011 - Two previously scheduled games, an Oct. 1 game against UC Davis and an Oct. 29 game against Edward Waters College, were dropped from the schedule that originally featured 11 games. The Aggies bought out the final game of their 2-year contract with South Alabama, while South Alabama and Edward Waters mutually agreed to end their 2-year contract early. South moved the game against Henderson State up to Oct. 29 and added a Nov. 3 meeting with Mississippi Valley State.
 May 6, 2011 - Ole Miss transfer Raymond Cotton left the South Alabama football program and transferred to Mississippi Gulf Coast Community College. Cotton was highly thought of and was rumored to be the favorite to be the starting quarterback for the Jaguars in 2011 but a shoulder injury in 2010 and strong competition at the position saw Cotton drop in the depth chart.
 September 1, 2011 - The game between the West Alabama Tigers and South Alabama Jaguars was televised for the first time on local network WJTC and online on ESPN3.
 September 16, 2011 - South suffered its first loss in its short history, falling to NC State. This was South's first game against a Football Bowl Subdivision team.
 September 24, 2011 - South suffered its second consecutive loss in program history, falling to Kent State.
 December 5, 2011 - South relieved Offensive Coordinator Greg Gregory of his duties. A replacement has not been announced.

References

South Alabama
South Alabama Jaguars football seasons
South Alabama Jaguars football